This article presents lists of the literary events and publications in 1576.

Events
December – James Burbage opens The Theatre, the second permanent public playhouse in London (and the first to have a substantial life – 22 years), ushering in the great age of Elizabethan drama.
unknown dates
The composer Richard Farrant opens the first Blackfriars Theatre in London, presenting plays performed by the Children of the Chapel.
The composer Thomas Whythorne writes a Booke of songs and sonetts with longe discourses sett with them, an early example of autobiographical writing in English.

New books

Prose
Jean Bodin – Les Six livres de la République (The Six Books of the Republic)
Ulpian Fulwell – Ars adulandi, or, The Art of Flattery (dialogues)
Étienne de La Boétie (died 1563) – Discourse on Voluntary Servitude (Discours de la servitude volontaire, published as Le Contr'un)
George Pettie – A Petite Palace of Pettie His Pleasure
Peter Martyr Vermigli (died 1562; edited by Robert le Maçon) – Loci Communes
George Whetstone – The Rocke of Regard

Drama
Luigi Pasqualigo – Il Fedele
George Wapull – The Tide Tarrieth No Man published

Poetry
See 1576 in poetry
Tulsidas – Ramcharitmanas
The Paradise of Dainty Devices, the most popular of the Elizabethan verse miscellanies

Births
January 12 – Petrus Scriverius, Dutch historian (died 1660) 
May 27 – Caspar Schoppe, German controversialist (died 1649) 
June 6 – Giovanni Diodati, Bible translator (died 1649) 
October – John Marston, English dramatist and poet (died 1634) 
October 30 – Enrico Caterino Davila, Italian historian (died 1631)
unknown dates
William Ames, English philosopher (died 1633) 
Johann Bogermann, Dutch translator (died 1637)
Samuel Collins, theologian (died 1651)
Charles Fitzgeoffrey, Elizabethan poet (died 1638)
Goldastus, Swiss Calvinist historian (died 1635)
John Weever, English poet and antiquary (died 1632)

Deaths
January 19 – Hans Sachs, German poet and dramatist (born 1494) 
February 10 – Wilhelm Xylander, German classical scholar (born 1532) 
March 18 – Johann Stössel, German Lutheran theologian (born 1524; died in prison)
May 2 – Bartolomé Carranza, Spanish theologian (born 1503)
June 30 – Franciscus Sonnius, Flemish theologian (born 1506)
October 14 – Konrad Heresbach, Calvinist writer (born 1496)
unknown dates
Basil Faber, German theologian (born 1520)
Aloysius Lilius, Italian philosopher (born c. 1510)
Lancelot Ridley, English theologian
Mavro Vetranović, Croatian Benedictine poet and author (born 1482)

References

Years of the 16th century in literature